James Alexander McKay (28 March 1901 – 1997) was an English footballer who played in the Football League for Clapton Orient and Fulham.

References

1901 births
1997 deaths
English footballers
Association football forwards
English Football League players
Dartford F.C. players
Fulham F.C. players
Leyton Orient F.C. players
Aldershot F.C. players